Peter Leon is a Canadian politician, who was appointed to Toronto City Council on October 10, 2013 to succeed Doug Holyday in Ward 3 (Etobicoke Centre).

A former building material salesman, Leon once served in the Etobicoke Library Board and as chair of Etobicoke Hydro. Leon was selected by the city council over Chris Stockwell, a former Member of Provincial Parliament, and Agnes Potts, a former member of Etobicoke's city council prior to the municipal amalgamation of Toronto in 1997.

Leon has been in Etobicoke for 56 years and lives in Eatonville, Toronto in Ward 5 Etobicoke—Lakeshore. He said he will complete his term in 2014 and will not run for re-election.

References

Toronto city councillors
Living people
People from Etobicoke
1942 births